This article lists political parties in Kazakhstan. Kazakhstan is a dominant-party state with Amanat in power. There are 7 legal parties in Kazakhstan. Political reforms towards Western-styled multi-party politics and electioneering have made easier for people to join a party. And to be a registered political party in Kazakhstan at least 20,000 person membership is required.

Parties represented in the Mäjilis

Extra-parliamentary parties

Notes

Banned or unregistered parties

Former parties
True Bright Path (Naǵyz Aq Jol)
Agrarian Party of Kazakhstan (Qazaqstan Agrarlyq Partııasy)
All Together (Asar) 
Civic Party of Kazakhstan (Qazaqstan Azamattyq Partııasy)
Party of Patriots
Rukhaniyat Party
Democratic Party (Demokratııalyq Partııasy "Ádilet")
Socialist Resistance of Kazakhstan
For a Just Kazakhstan

Historical parties
Alash

See also
 Politics of Kazakhstan
 List of political parties by country

References

Kazakhstan
Political parties
 
Political parties
Kazakhstan
Kazakhstan